William Rishanger (born 1250), nicknamed "Chronigraphus", was an English annalist and Benedictine monk of St. Albans.
Rishanger quite likely wrote the Opus Chronicorum, a continuation from 1259 of Matthew Paris's Chronicle. In effect it is a history of his own times from 1259 to 1307, a spirited and trustworthy account, albeit in parts not original. 
He wrote a history of the reign of Edward I of England, and a work on the Barons' War; and was probably the continuator of Gesta Abbatum Monasterii Sancti Albani.

Notes

Sources
James P. Carley, ‘Rishanger, William (b. 1249/50, d. after 1312)’, Oxford Dictionary of National Biography, Oxford University Press, 2004.
James Orchard Halliwell (1840), The Chronicle of William de Rishanger, Camden Society

English Benedictines
14th-century English historians
1250 births
14th-century deaths
Historians of England